The 1860 United States elections elected the members of the 37th United States Congress. The election marked the start of the Third Party System and precipitated the Civil War. The Republican Party won control of the Presidency and both houses of Congress, making it the fifth party (following the Federalist Party, Democratic-Republican Party, Democratic Party, and Whig Party) to accomplish such a feat. The election is widely considered to be a realigning election.

In the Presidential election, Republican former Representative Abraham Lincoln of Illinois defeated Democratic Vice President John C. Breckinridge (who became the first incumbent Vice President to lose a presidential election) and Democratic Senator Stephen A. Douglas of Illinois, as well as the Constitutional Union candidate, former Senator John Bell of Tennessee. Lincoln swept the Northern states while Breckinridge carried much of the South, foreshadowing the political alignment of the country throughout the Third Party System. At the 1860 Republican National Convention, Lincoln won on the third ballot, defeating Senator William H. Seward of New York and several other candidates. The Democratic Party split its votes after three chaotic conventions. Douglas was nominated at the second Democratic convention, while the Southern Democrats nominated Breckinridge as their own candidate in a third convention. Bell ran on a platform of preserving the union regardless of the status of slavery. Lincoln's victory made him the first Republican President. Lincoln took just under 40 percent of the popular vote, a lower share of the popular vote than any other winning presidential candidate aside from John Quincy Adams's 1824 campaign.

In the House, Republicans retained control of the chamber and won a majority for the first time after several states seceded. Democrats remained the largest minority, but several Congressmen also identified as unionists.

In the Senate, Republicans made moderate gains, but Democrats initially retained a majority. They lost that majority shortly after the election when several Southern senators resigned. The Democrats would have the second-most members in the Senate, although many senators identified as unionists rather than Democrats or Republicans.

See also
1860 United States presidential election
1860–61 United States House of Representatives elections
1860–61 United States Senate elections
1860 Illinois gubernatorial election
1860 Michigan gubernatorial election
1860 Missouri gubernatorial election
1860 Pennsylvania gubernatorial election

References

1860 elections in the United States
1860